Martinsellus signatus is a species of beetle in the family Cerambycidae, the only species in the genus Martinsellus.

References

Trachyderini
Monotypic Cerambycidae genera